Rhodogune was a Persian princess from the Achaemenid dynasty, who was a daughter of the King of Kings Artaxerxes II and one of his concubines.

Following the Battle of Cunaxa in 401 BC, she was given by her father in marriage to the Bactrian nobleman Orontes I, who was the satrap of the satrapy of Armenia. Their marriage is mentioned in one of the stelae of Mount Nemrut, erected by their descendant Antiochus I of Commagene in order to highlight the Commagenian claim to Achaemenid ancestry.

References

Sources

Further reading 
 

5th-century BC Iranian people
5th-century BC women
Achaemenid princesses
Year of birth unknown
Year of death unknown